Sphingosine-1-phosphate receptor 1 (S1P receptor 1 or S1PR1), also known as endothelial differentiation gene 1 (EDG1) is a protein that in humans is encoded by the S1PR1 gene. S1PR1 is a G-protein-coupled receptor which binds the bioactive signaling molecule sphingosine 1-phosphate (S1P).  S1PR1 belongs to a sphingosine-1-phosphate receptor subfamily comprising five members (S1PR1-5). S1PR1 was originally identified as an abundant transcript in endothelial cells and it has an important role in regulating endothelial cell cytoskeletal structure, migration, capillary-like network formation and vascular maturation.  In addition, S1PR1 signaling is important in the regulation of lymphocyte maturation, migration and trafficking.

Structure 

S1PR1 like the other members of the GPCR family is composed of seven-transmembrane helices arranged in a structurally conserved bundle. As well as the other GPCRs, in the extracellular region S1PR1 is composed of three loops: ECL1 between helices II and III, ECL2 between helices IV and V and ECL3 between helices VI and VII. Compared to the other members of the family, S1PR1 has some specific features. The N-terminal of the protein folds as a helical cap above the top of the receptor and therefore it limits the access of the ligands to the amphipathic binding pocket. This marked amphipathicity is indeed in agreement with the zwitterionic nature of S1P. In addition, helices ECL1 and ECL2 pack tightly against the N-terminal helix, further occluding the access of the ligand from the extracellular space. S1P or S1P analogs are likely to reach the binding pocket from within the cell membrane and not from the extracellular space, may be through an opening between helices I and VII. Compared to the other GPCRs, this region is more open due to a different positioning of helices I and II toward helix III. This occlusion of the ligand access space from the extracellular space could also explain the slow saturation of receptor binding in the presence of excess of ligand.

Function 

Like the other members of the GPCR family, S1PR1 senses its ligand from outside the cell and activates intracellular signal pathways that at last lead to cellular responses. The signal is transduced through the association of the receptor with different G proteins, which recruits a series of systems for downstream amplification of the signal.

Immune system 

S1PR1 activation is heavily involved in immune cell regulation and development. Sphingosine-1-phosphate receptor 1 is also involved in immune-modulation and directly involved in suppression of innate immune responses from T cells. Depending on the G protein coupled with the S1PR1, diverse cellular effects are achieved: Gαi and Gαo modulate cellular survival, proliferation and motility; Gα12 and Gα13 modulate cytoskeletal remodeling and cell-shape changes and Gαq modulates several cellular effector functions. All the intracellular functions occur via the interaction with Gαi and Gαo: these two proteins recruit other proteins for downstream amplification of the signal. The main functions of S1P-S1PR1 system are as follows:
 The phosphatidylinositol 3-kinase (PI3K) and the lipid dependent protein kinase B (PKB) signaling pathway increases the survival of lymphocytes and other immune cells by inhibiting apoptosis.
 Phosphoinositide 3-kinase (PI3K) and the GTPase RAC are responsible of the lymphocytes migration and their interactions with other cells or with connective-tissue surfaces. S1PR1-deficient thymocytes do not emigrate from the thymus, resulting in an increased numbers of mature thymocytes in the thymus and in medullary hyperplasia, and few S1PR1-deficient T cells can be detected in the blood, lymph nodes, spleen or non-lymphoid organs in these mouse models. The proliferation of immune cells is due to S1P-mediated signals via the GTPase RAS and extracellular-signal regulated kinase (ERK). IV) The Phospholipase C (PLC)-induced increases in intracellular calcium levels allow the secretion of cytokines and other immune mediators.

Vasculogenesis 

S1PR1 is one of the main receptors responsible for vascular growth and development, at least during embryogenesis. In vascular endothelial cells the binding of S1P to S1PR1 induces migration, proliferation, cell survival and morphogenesis into capillary-like structures. Moreover, the binding of S1P to S1PR1 is implicated in the formation of cell-cell adherens junctions, therefore inhibiting paracellular permeability of solutes and macromolecules. It was also shown in vivo that S1P synergizes with angiogenic factors such as FGF-2 and VEGF in inducing angiogenesis and vascular maturation through S1PR1. showed that S1PR1-KO mice died during development due to a defect in vascular stabilization, suggesting that this receptor is essential for vascular development. In conclusion, several evidences confirm that S1P via S1PR1 is a potent regulator of vascular growth and development, at least during embryogenesis.

Clinical significance

Cancer 

S1PR1 is involved in the motility of cancer cells upon stimulation by S1P. The signal pathway involves RAC-CDC42 and correlates with ERK1 and ERK2 activation. The RAC-CDC42 pathway leads to cell migration, whereas the ERK pathway leads to proliferation and neovascularization demonstrated that S1PR1 is strongly induced in endothelial cells during tumor angiogenesis and a siRNA against S1PR1 was able to inhibit angiogenesis and tumor growth. S1PR1 is also involved in other types of cancer: fibrosarcoma cells migrate upon activation of S1PR1 by S1P via RAC1–CDC42 dependent pathway) and ovarian cancer cell invasion involves S1PR1 or S1PR3 and calcium mobilization.

Multiple sclerosis 

S1PR1 is involved in multiple sclerosis. Fingolimod, a drug which internalizes the receptor, is approved as a disease modifying agent in MS. There are other Sphingosine-1-phosphate receptor modulators.
Van Doorn et al. (2010) observed a strong increase in S1PR1 (and S1PR3) expression in hypertrophic astrocytes both in the active and inactive MS lesions from MS patients compared to the unaffected patients.

Interactions 

S1PR1 has been shown to interact with 5-HT1A receptor, GNAI1, and GNAI3.

See also 
 Lysophospholipid receptor

References

External links 
 
 

G protein-coupled receptors
Immune system